Energy in Korea may refer to:

 Energy in North Korea
 Energy in South Korea

See also
 Energy in Asia